Frances Mary Guy (born 1 February 1959) is a British former ambassador and UN Women's representative, now head of Middle East region at Christian Aid.

Early life
Guy was born on 1 February 1959 to David Guy and Elizabeth Guy (née Hendry). She was educated at George Watson's College, Edinburgh. She studied international relations at Aberdeen University, graduating with an undergraduate Master of Arts (MA Hons) degree. She then studied at the Bologna Center of Johns Hopkins University, graduating with a diploma, and Carleton University, Ottawa, graduating with a postgraduate Master of Arts (MA) degree in international relations.

Career
Guy joined the Foreign and Commonwealth Office (FCO) in 1985 and served at Khartoum, Bangkok and Addis Ababa as well as at the FCO.  She was Ambassador to Yemen 2001–04, head of the FCO's Engaging the Islamic World group 2004–06, and Ambassador to Lebanon 2006–11. She was adviser on the Middle East to the Foreign Secretary 2011–12, including a role as the Foreign Secretary's envoy to the Syrian opposition. From May 2012 to December 2014 she was the representative of UN Women in Iraq. She is now head of Middle East region at Christian Aid, based in London.

Frances Guy is a Visiting Senior Research Fellow in the Middle East & Mediterranean Studies Programme at King's College London. She is a former president of the British Society of Middle East Studies (BRISMES) and a trustee of the  Alexandria Trust for education in the Arab region.

References
GUY, Frances Mary, Who's Who 2014, A & C Black, 2014; online edn, Oxford University Press, Dec 2013

1959 births
Living people
People educated at George Watson's College
Alumni of the University of Aberdeen
Johns Hopkins University alumni
Carleton University alumni
Ambassadors of the United Kingdom to Yemen
Ambassadors of the United Kingdom to Lebanon
British officials of the United Nations
British women ambassadors
Middle Eastern studies scholars